Absher is an unincorporated community in Adair County, Kentucky, United States.  Its elevation is 906 feet (276 m).

References

Unincorporated communities in Adair County, Kentucky
Unincorporated communities in Kentucky